Yathekyaung (also spelled Rathekyaung) was a semi-legendary king of Pagan Dynasty of Burma (Myanmar). According to 18th and 19th century Burmese chronicles Maha Yazawin and Hmannan Yazawin he was a monk and the tutor of Pyusawhti, who put him on the throne. He is not accepted as a king by some modern historians.

Notes

References

 
 

Burmese monarchs
Pagan dynasty